Santa María la Antigua del Darién—turned into Dariena in the Latin of De Orbo Novo—was a Spanish colonial town founded in 1510 by Vasco Núñez de Balboa, located in present-day Colombia approximately  south of Acandí, within the municipality of Unguía in the Chocó Department. It was the first city founded by conquistadors in mainland America. After Pascual de Andagoya, a Spanish-Basque conquistador under the direction of Panama governor Pedrarias Dávila, founded Panama City in 1519, Santa María la Antigua del Darién was abandoned and in 1524 was attacked and burned by the indigenous people.

In 2012 the lost site of the town was rediscovered, and in 2019 the government of Colombia opened the Parque Arqueológico e Histórico de Santa María de Belén la Antigua del Darién.

Foundation

References 

Populated places established in 1510
1519 disestablishments in Colombia